This is a list of major football stadiums, grouped by country and ordered by capacity. It does not include American Football stadiums in the USA that are also used for association football.

Albania

Algeria

Argentina

Armenia

Australia

Note that many of the Australian stadiums are multi-purpose venues. Of those listed, only Coopers Stadium in Adelaide, South Australia is a soccer-specific venue.

A-League venues (2014–15):

Austria

Arnold Schwarzenegger Stadion ex Prater Stadium

Azerbaijan

Bahrain

Bangladesh

Belarus

Belgium

Bolivia

Bosnia and Herzegovina

Botswana

Brazil

Bulgaria

Cambodia

Cameroon

Canada

China

Mainland China

Hong Kong

Macau

Chile

Colombia

Croatia

Cyprus

Czech Republic

Denmark

DR Congo

Egypt

Estonia

Ethiopia

Finland

France

Georgia

Germany

Ghana

Greece

Hungary

India

Indonesia

Iran

Iraq

Ireland

Israel

Italy

Japan

North Korea

South Korea

Kuwait

Laos

Latvia

Lithuania

Malaysia

Mexico

Monaco

Montenegro

Moldova

Morocco

Netherlands

New Zealand

Nigeria

Northern Cyprus

Norway

Pakistan

Paraguay

Peru

Philippines

Poland

Portugal

Romania

Russia

Serbia

Singapore

Slovakia

Spain

South Africa
The following is a list of stadiums in South Africa, ordered by capacity. Currently all stadiums with a capacity of 30,000 or more are included.

Sweden

Switzerland

Tanzania

Tunisia

Turkey

Ukraine

United Kingdom

England

Northern Ireland

Scotland

Wales

United States

Uruguay

See also
List of football (soccer) stadiums by capacity
List of association football competitions
List of stadiums
List of indoor arenas
List of stadiums by capacity
List of African stadiums by capacity
List of Asian stadiums by capacity
List of European stadiums by capacity
List of North American stadiums by capacity
List of Oceanian stadiums by capacity
List of South American stadiums by capacity
List of American football stadiums by capacity

References

External links
The Stadium Guide
fussballtempel.net
English Football
worldstadiums
Playaway UK – On-line Football Stadium Guide 
Stadiums world

 
 
 Football